is a 2022 crime drama/comedy reality show, produced by Netflix and launched on the streaming service on March 8, 2022. It stars the comedy duo Chidori and features a number of Japanese comedians as contestants.

Premise 
The story is a crime drama which starts at the NF High School, where a precious painting has been stolen from the principal's office. Several times each episode, a character would pose a question to the contestants, who also play roles in the drama and would then drop character and tell a story relevant to the question. In the end of each episode, one or more contestants would be eliminated from the contest and also removed from the plot.

Production 
Last One Standing was inspired by the "Dramatic Heartbreak King" segments of the variety show , which was also produced by Nobuyuki Sakuma and hosted by Chidori, and aired primarily on TV Tokyo for three seasons from 2016 to 2018.

Reception 
Last One Standing became Netflix's most popular show in Japan after its premiere. Decider rated the show "Stream It", commenting that it is "fun watching the contestants trying to one-up each other" and contrasted it to the "serious and dramatic" plot. The Times of India rated it 3.5 out of five stars, similarly praised its "entertaining" combination of suspenseful elements with light-hearted humor and suggested it might inspire an Indian adaptation.

Cast

MC 
Nobu (Chidori)

Observers 

 Karen Takizawa
 Shiori Sato
 Reina Triendl

Drama 

 Shotaro Mamiya as Saiki
 Hikaru Takahashi as Misato
 Masahiro Higashide as Sudo
 Koki Okada as Kubota
 Yuki Morinaga as Sakurai
 Kaito Yoshimura as Student
 Nadal as Student
 Takenori Goto as Iwata
 Mikie Hara as Teacher
 Yoshifumi Sakai as Teacher 
 Yoshiyuki Morishita

Episodes

See also 
 Murderville

References

External links 

 Last One Standing on Netflix

Japanese-language Netflix original programming
Improvisational television series
Murder in television
Japanese thriller television series
Japanese comedy television series